An-Nasr, ("Help", or "[Divine] Support" ), is the 110th chapter (sūrah) of the Qur'an with 3 āyāt or verses. 
۝ WHEN the assistance of Allah shall come, and the victory;
۝ and thou shalt see the people enter into the religion of Allah by troops:
۝ celebrate the praise of thy LORD, and ask pardon of him; for he is inclined to forgive.

An-Nasr translates to English as both "the victory" and "the help or assistance". It is the second-shortest surah after Al-Kawthar. Surah 112 (al-Ikhlāṣ) actually has fewer words in Arabic than Surah An-Nasr, yet it has four verses.

Text and meaning

Text and transliteration
Hafs from Aasim ibn Abi al-Najud

¹ 

² 

³ 

Warsh from Nafiʽ al-Madani

¹ 

² 

³

Meanings

When comes the Help of Allah (to you, O Muhammad (Peace be upon him) against your enemies) and the conquest (of Makkah),

And you see that the people enter Allah's religion (Islam) in crowds,

So glorify the Praises of your Lord, and ask for His Forgiveness. Verily, He is the One Who accepts the repentance and forgives.

When the victory of Allah has come and the conquest,

And you see the people entering into the religion of Allah in multitudes,

Then exalt [Him] with praise of your Lord and ask forgiveness of Him. Indeed, He is ever Accepting of repentance.

When comes the Help of Allah, and Victory,

And thou dost see the people enter Allah's Religion in crowds,

Celebrate the praises of thy Lord, and pray for His Forgiveness: For He is Oft-Returning (in Grace and Mercy).

When Allah's succour and the triumph cometh

And thou seest mankind entering the religion of Allah in troops,

Then hymn the praises of thy Lord, and seek forgiveness of Him. Lo! He is ever ready to show mercy.

Summary
1–3  Command to praise God for the victory of Islam  

The surah praises Allah for leading numerous people to Islam. This surah is also known as "The Victory" as in the victory of Islam as it refers to the conquest of Mecca where Muslims beat the enemies of Islam.

This surah talks about the very same battle. It is said that after this battle people realized the Muslims never lost because Allah was on their side and then many people joined Islam.

According to Tafsir ibn Kathir, this surah is equal to 1/4 of the Quran. This was the last surah to be revealed, only a few months before Muhammad's death.

The first ayah means that with the help of God the Muslims were victorious. 
The second ayah means that after the battle crowds of people came to accept Islam. 
The third ayah means that God allowed people to join Islam and gave them a second chance no matter how harsh their crimes are, because God is the all-forgiving to humankind.

Hadith 

This short surah brings the good news to Muhammad concerning the advent of victory, the conquest and peoples' collective acceptance of Islam. It instructs him to turn towards God in a devoted adoration and a humble request for his forgiveness. The surah also presents the nature and the righteousness of this faith and its ideology - how high humanity ascends to an ideal and brilliant summit unattainable otherwise than by responding to the call of Islam.

Of the several traditions regarding the revelation of this surah, that of Imam Ahmad, goes as follows:

Aisha said that Muhammad used to repeat very frequently, towards the end of his life, 'Exaltations and praises be to God, whose forgiveness I ask; I repent of my sins.' He also said, 'My Lord told me I would see a sign in my nation. He ordered me to praise him, the Forgiving, and ask his pardon when I see this sign. Indeed,I have When the victory granted by God and the conquest come ... (transmitted by Muslim)

Ibn Katheer said in his commentary on the Qur'an:

The Conquest, it is unanimously agreed, is a reference to the conquest of Mecca. The Arab tribes were awaiting the settlement of the conflict between Quraish and the Muslims, before accepting Islam, saying: 'If he, Muhammad, prevails over his people, he would indeed be a prophet.' Consequently, when that was accomplished they accepted Islam in large numbers. Not two years were to pass after the conquest of Mecca when the whole Arabian Peninsula was dominated by Islam, and, all thanks to God, every Arab tribe had declared its belief Islam.

Al-Bukhari in his Sahih related:

Amr ibn Salamah said that when Mecca was conquered, every tribe hastened to declare acceptance of Islam to Muhammad. They were waiting for it to take place saying: 'Leave them to themselves.' He would indeed be a prophet if he prevailed over them.

This version is the one which agrees chronologically with the beginning of the surah in the sense that its revelation was a sign of something to follow with some instructions to the Prophet on what he should do when this event took place.

There is, nevertheless, another fairly similar version in agreement with the one we have chosen and it is that by Ibn 'Abbas which says:

Umar used to let me join the company of elders who were present at Badr, some of whom felt uneasy and asked why I should be allowed with them when I was young. But ' Umar said to them, 'You know that he is of high standing.' One day 'Umar invited them all and invited me as well. I felt that he wanted to show them who I was so he asked them, 'What do you make of God's saying, ' When the victory granted by God and the conquest come?' Some of them replied, 'He ordered us to praise him and seek his forgiveness when he helps us to triumph and bestows his favours on us.' The others remained silent. Then 'Umar asked me, 'Do you agree with this view, Ibn Abbas?' I answered in the negative. 'Umar asked me again. 'What then do you say?' I replied, 'It was a sign from God to Muhammad indicating the approach of the end of his life meaning, when the victory from God and the conquest come, you; end is near, so extol the praises of your Lord and seek his forgiveness.' 'Umar commented, 'I have known no more than what you have said. (transmitted by al Bukhari).

So it is possible that Muhammad, having witnessed God's sign, realized that he had fulfilled his mission on this earth and that it was time for him to leave, which was what Ibn 'Abbas actually meant.

However, there is another account narrated by Al-Hafiz al Baihaqi also attributed to Ibn 'Abbas who according to it said

When this surah was first revealed, Muhammad called Fatimah and said, 'My death has been announced to me.' She was seen to start crying, then she smiled. She explained later, 'I cried when he told me of his approaching death. But he said to me, 'Be restrained, because you will be the first of my family to join me', so I smiled.'

According to the last tradition quoted the time of the revelation of the surah is actually fixed as coming later than the sign, that is, the conquest and the people's collective movement into Islam. When events took place in this fashion, Muhammad knew that his life would soon come to a close. But again the first account is more authentic and fits in more suitably with the outline of the beginning of the surah, especially as the Fatimah incident is related in a different form which gives more weight to what we have suggested. This other form goes as follows:

Umm Salamah, Muhammad's wife said: Muhammad called Fatimah to him sometime during the year of the conquest and he said something to her. She cried. Then he spoke to her again and she was smiling. After he had died, I asked her about the incident and she explained 'Muhammad told me he was soon to die, so I cried. Then he told me that I would be the next most celebrated woman in Paradise after Mariam (Mary), the daughter of Imran, so I smiled.'

This narration agrees with the general meaning of the Quranic text and with what Imam Ahmad related which appears in the Sahih of Muslim - that is, there was a sign (in the surah) between God and Muhammad and when the conquest was accomplished the latter knew that he was soon to meet God, so he spoke to Fatimah in the manner described by Umm Salamah.

Let us now consider the actual text of the surah and the injunction it gives for all time: When the victory granted by God and the conquest come, and people embrace the religion of God in large numbers. Then, celebrate the praises of your Lord and seek his forgiveness. He is ever disposed to mercy.

The beginning of the first verse implicitly presents a concept of what goes on in this universe: the events that take place in this life, and the actual role of Muhammad and his followers in the progress of Islam, and to what extent it depends on their efforts. "When the victory granted by God", denotes that it is God's victory and God is the one who brings it about in his own good time, in the form he decides and for the purpose he determines. Muhammad and his companions have nothing to do with it at all, and they obtain no personal gain from it. It suffices them that God does it through them, appoints them as its guards and entrusts it to them. This is all they acquire from the victory of God, the conquest and the people's acceptance en masse of his religion.

According to this concept, the duty of Muhammad and his companions whom God chose and gave the privilege of being the instruments of his victory, was to turn to him at the climax of victory in praise, expressing gratitude and seeking forgiveness. Gratitude and praise are for his being so generous as to have chosen them to be the standard bearers of his religion; for the mercy and favour he did to all humanity by making his religion victorious; and for the conquest of Meca and the people's collective acceptance of Islam.

God's forgiveness is sought for the various unrevealed, defective feelings, such as vanity, which sometimes creep into one's heart at the overwhelming moment of victory attained after a long struggle. Human beings can hardly prevent this happening and therefore God's forgiveness is to be sought for it. Forgiveness also has to be sought for what might have been insinuated into one's heart during the long and cruel struggle and for petulance resulting from the belatedness of victory or the effects of convulsive despair, as the Qur'an brings out elsewhere: Or think you that you will enter Paradise while yet there has not come to you the like of that which came to those who died before you? Affliction and adversity befell them; they were shaken as with earthquake, until Muhammad and those who believed along with him said: 'When will God's help come?' Now surely God's help is near. (Al-Qur'an 2:214)

It is also necessary to seek God's forgiveness for one's shortcomings in praising God and thanking Him for His favours which are perpetual and infinite. And if you were to count the favours of God, never will you be able to number them. (Qur'an 16:18)

However much one's efforts in this respect, they are never adequate. Another touching thought is that seeking forgiveness at the moment of triumph arouses in one's mind the feeling of impotence and imperfection at a time when an attitude of self-esteem and conceit seems natural. All these factors guarantee that no tyranny will afflict the conquered. The victorious is made to realize that it is Allah who has appointed him, a man who has no power of his own and is devoid of any strength, for a pre determined purpose; consequently the triumph and the conquest as well as the religion are all God's.

This is the lofty, dignified ideal the Qur'an exhorts people to toil towards and attain, an ideal in which man's exaltation is in neglecting his own pride and where his soul's freedom is in his subservience to God. The goal set is the total release of human souls from their egoistic shackles, their only ambition being to attain God's pleasure. Along with this release there must be exerted a striving which helps man to flourish in the world, promote human civilisation and provide a rightly-guided, unblemished, constructive, just leadership devoted to God. Surat al Nasr.
In contrast, man's efforts to liberate himself while in the grip of egoism, shackled by his zest for worldly things, or overpowered by his cravings, turn out to be absolutely in vain unless he sets himself free from self and lets his loyalty to God override everything else, particularly at the moment of triumph and the collecting of booty.

Such a standard of behaviour, which God wants humanity to aspire towards and to attain, was the characteristic feature of the prophets at all times.

So it was the case with Prophet Yussuf (Joseph), when all he wanted was achieved and his dream came true:

and he placed his parents high on the throne of dignity and they fell down prostrate before him. He said: 'Father! This is the fulfillment of my dream of old. My Lord has made it come true. He has been gracious to me. He has released me from prison and has brought you from the desert after Satan had stirred-up strife between me and my brothers. My Lord is gracious with all that He plans to do. He is full of Knowledge and Wisdom. (Qur'an 12:100)

Then, at that moment of climax, Joseph took himself away from the jubilations and from the embracing arms to turn towards his Lord, praising him with a pure feeling of gratitude: My Lord! You have given me something of sovereignty and power and have taught me something of the interpretation of visions. Creator of the heavens and the earth! You are my Protector in this world and the here after. Let me die in submission and join the righteous. (Qur'an 12:101)

Thus vanished the feeling of predominance and reputation and the happiness brought by his reunion with his family, and the picture we are left with is of that individual, Joseph, praying to God to help him remain submissive to him until he dies and to let him, out of God's mercy and grace, join his righteous servants. So, it was also with Prophet Sulaiman (Solomon), when he saw the Queen of Sheba's throne brought into his very reach in a flash: And when he (Solomon) saw it set in his presence he said: 'This is of the bounty of my Lord, that he may try me whether I give thanks or remain ungrateful. He who gives thanks does so for his own good, and he who is ungrateful ... my Lord is All-Sufficient and Bountiful. (Qur'an 27:40)

And so indeed it was with Muhammad all through his life. In the moment of triumph, as the Conquest of Mecca was accomplished, he entered it on the back of his camel with his head bowed down. He forgot the joy of victory and thankfully bowed his head seeking God's forgiveness, though he had just conquered Mecca, the city whose people had openly and unashamedly persecuted and expelled him. This also was the practice of his companions after him.

Thus, upon belief in God, was that great generation of humanity raised very high, reaching an unparalleled standard of greatness, power and freedom.

References

External links
 Quran 110  Clear Quran translation
 
 The Holy Qur'an, translated by Abdullah Yusuf Ali
 Three translations at Project Gutenberg
 Surah An-Nasr English transliteration

Nasr
Conversion to Islam